The Romanian Youth Labor (Munca Tineretului Român – MTR) was a paramilitary movement present in Romania during 1942-1944.

History
Having as an inspiration source the German Reichsarbeitsdienst (Reich Labour Service) organization (1934–1945), the Romanian political system ruled by gen. Ion Antonescu tried to avoid the Romanian youth to enroll in the Iron Guard.

The Law no. 425 from 15 May 1941 regulated the unemployed compulsoriness to work for civic use (for both the Romanians and Jews). Being focused on the youth paramilitary training, Romanian Youth Labour aimed at educating its members in the spirit of the social labor and training them for building civil works: viaducts, aqueducts, tunnels, bridges and roads.

The organization headquarters was in Breaza, in the same building where the Military High School is placed today. The Commanders’ Center of Straja Ţării was also located there between 1937-1940.
The center was coordinated by gen. Emil Pălăngeanu and lt. col. Ioan Dem. Dimăncescu.

The organization ceased its activity after August 23, 1944 when Romania switched sides from the Axis to the Allies.

See also
Reichsarbeitsdienst RAD

References

Labor history
Youth organizations based in Romania
Fascism in Romania
1942 establishments in Romania